Time Trumpet is a six-episode satirical television comedy series which aired on BBC Two in August 2006. The series was written by Armando Iannucci, Roger Drew and Will Smith in a similar manner to Iannucci's earlier one-off programmes, 2004: The Stupid Version and Clinton: His Struggle with Dirt. One sketch was later spun off by network in Ireland, RTÉ, into the cult television series Soupy Norman, in May 2007.

Premise
Time Trumpet is set in the year 2031, and is a retrospective documentary on the first thirty years of the 21st century. Actors and actresses play the parts of 'today's stars' thirty years on, who are interviewed as part of the show.

These 'older selves' include David Beckham, Anne Robinson, David Cameron, Sebastian Coe, Kate Middleton, Charlotte Church, Ant & Dec, June Sarpong, Tony Blair, Alastair Campbell, Charles Clarke, Noel Edmonds, Chris Moyles, Gordon Brown, David Miliband, Bob Geldof, Saddam Hussein, Natasha Kaplinsky, Prince Harry, Jamie Oliver and the woman who released the doves at the end of the Michael Jackson trial.

The show also includes interviews with comedians, billed in the show as "top cultural commentators slash TV pundits", speaking about the events of the past. These include Stewart Lee (also appearing as the bald-headed 'Stu Lee', the implication being that he was contractually obliged to shave his head and change his name), Richard Ayoade, Jo Enright, Matthew Holness, Adam Buxton, Mark Watson and David Sant. Additionally, Katy Wix and Tim Key appear in sketches throughout the series.

Every episode is narrated by Iannucci, who is also seen interviewing guests, but at an oblique angle and with a different physical appearance. Series co-creator Will Smith also appears in the series.

Each episode has a main theme running throughout, such as the Olympics or the war in Iraq. The main running gag is the promise of a catch-up with "an increasingly odd Tom Cruise" and features the now-elderly actor making bizarre claims such as to be "pound for pound the world's strongest man".

Episodes

Controversy
The third episode, which featured a jumbo jet crashing into the British Houses of Parliament and the subsequent assassination of Tony Blair, was due to be screened on 17 August 2006, but was cancelled in the wake of the 2006 transatlantic aircraft plot, and substituted by another episode. The cancelled episode was subsequently shown a week later, without the footage of an assassinated Blair. However, a related sketch was aired, involving a play on the events of 9/11, where two towers are flown into an aeroplane.

Home media
A DVD of the series was released on 27 April 2009. The assassination of Tony Blair sketch was removed from this, as were some sketches that included footage of the Olympic Games.

Legacy
 One sketch depicted real life Polish soap opera Pierwsza miłość becoming a hit across Europe, which was followed by a scene dubbed into English in a humorous way, changing the setting from Poland to Ireland. This ended up forming the basis of the cult television show Soupy Norman on RTÉ.
 Alan Moore's final issue of The League of Extraordinary Gentlemen includes a reference to the in series game show "Rape an Ape", as well as several references to Iannucci's The Thick of It.

American remake
In December 2011, network in the United States, Comedy Central announced they would be remaking the series, with Iannucci as producer. Ultimately, the series was not picked up by the network, and Iannucci moved on to other projects.

References

External links
 
 
 Iannucci profiled on BBC News' "Faces of the Week" (4 November 2005) with reference to Time Trumpet
 BBC comedy blog

2006 British television series debuts
2006 British television series endings
2000s British satirical television series
BBC television comedy
British mockumentary television series
English-language television shows
Political satirical television series
Television series about television
Television series set in the 2030s